Robert Carlisle Smith (April 11, 1929 – August 2, 2001) was a Canadian sprint canoer who competed in the late 1950s. At the 1956 Summer Olympics in Melbourne, he was eliminated in the heats both of the K-1 1000 m and the K-2 1000 m events.

References 

Robert Smith's profile at Sports Reference.com

1929 births
Canadian male canoeists
Canoeists at the 1956 Summer Olympics
Olympic canoeists of Canada
2001 deaths